Enes Karić (born May 16, 1958) is a Bosnian Islamic scholar and full professor of Quranic Studies at the Faculty of Islamic Studies, University of Sarajevo. From 1994 to 1996, he served as the Minister of Education, Science, Culture and Sports in the Republic of Bosnia and Herzegovina.

Biography
Born on May 16, 1958 in Travnik, Bosnia and Herzegovina to Emin and Sabiha, Karić initially studied Islam and political science at the University of Sarajevo and graduated in 1981 and 1982 respectively. He earned a M.A. in philosophy from the same university in 1986, and obtained his Ph.D. in philology from the University of Belgrade in 1989. He has also completed other post-graduate and post-doctoral studies at the University of Cairo (1983), al-Azhar University (1983), Yale University (1990), and Oxford University (2006). Currently, he serves as full professor of Quranic Studies and History of the Interpretation of the Qur'an at the University of Sarajevo; Karić has also taught as a full professor at the University of Ljubljana. From 1994 to 1996, he served as the Minister of Education, Science, Culture and Sports in the Government of the Republic of Bosnia and Herzegovina.

Works
 Essays (on behalf) of Bosnia (1999)
 The Bosniac Idea (2002) 
 Essays on Our European Never-never Land (2004)
 Contributions to Twentieth Century Islamic Thought in Bosnia and Herzegovina (2011)
 The Black Tulip (2011)
 Traditional Bosnia: Islamic Theological, Philosophical, and Logical Studies from the 15th Century Onward (2016)

See also
 Muzaffar Iqbal

References

Living people
1958 births
People from Travnik
University of Sarajevo alumni
University of Belgrade alumni
Academic staff of the University of Sarajevo
Academic staff of the University of Ljubljana
21st-century Muslim theologians
20th-century Muslim theologians
Muslim scholars of Islamic studies